The Africa Zone was one of the four zones within Group 3 of the regional Davis Cup competition in 2014. The zone's competition was held in round robin format in Cairo, Egypt, in September 2014. The nine competing nations were divided into one pool of four teams and one of five. The winners and runners up from each pool played off to determine the two nations to be promoted to Europe/Africa Zone Group II in 2015, while the third and fourth placed nations played to off to determine overall placings within the group.

Participating nations

Draw

The eight teams were divided into one pool of four teams, and one of five. The winner of each pool plays off against the runner-up of the other pool, and the two winners of these play-offs are promoted to Europe/Africa Zone Group II in 2015. The third and fourth placed teams in each pool play off against the equivalent team from the other pool to determine overall rankings within the group. The fifth placed team in pool B does not enter the play-offs.

The group was staged from the 8th to the 13th September 2014 at the Smash Tennis Academy in Cairo, Egypt.

Pool A

Pool B

First round

Pool A

Zimbabwe vs. Congo

Madagascar vs. Congo

Zimbabwe vs. Nigeria

Nigeria vs. Congo

Zimbabwe vs. Madagascar

Madagascar vs. Nigeria

Pool B

Algeria vs. Botswana

Benin vs. Mozambique

Namibia vs. Botswana

Algeria vs. Mozambique

Benin vs. Namibia

Botswana vs. Mozambique

Benin vs. Algeria

Namibia vs. Mozambique

Benin vs. Botswana

Algeria vs. Namibia

Play-offs

Promotion

Zimbabwe vs. Namibia

Madagascar vs. Algeria

5th place play-off: Nigeria vs. Benin

7th place play-off: Congo vs. Mozambique

Outcomes

References

2014 Davis Cup Europe/Africa Zone
Davis Cup Europe/Africa Zone